This is a list of national and provincial heritage sites in South Africa, as declared by the South African Heritage Resource Agency (SAHRA) and the nine provincial heritage resources authorities. The list is maintained by SAHRA by means of an online, publicly accessible database, the South African Heritage Resources Information System (SAHRIS), that also serves as an integrated national heritage resources management tool.

World Heritage Sites

 Cape Floral Region Protected Areas
 Fossil Hominid Sites of Sterkfontein, Swartkrans, Kromdraai, and Environs 
 iSimangaliso Wetland Park 
 Mapungubwe Cultural Landscape 
 Richtersveld Cultural and Botanical Landscape 
 Robben Island
 Maloti-Drakensberg Park
 Vredefort Dome

National heritage sites

 Peanut Farm 
 Boschendal 
 Cape Blue whale Cultural Landscape
 Super man Cave
 Drimolen
 Charlotte Maxeke Grave
 Gladysvale
 Gondolin, Broederstroom
 Kaditshwene Cultural landscape
 Kromdraai fossil site
 Madiba House (inside Drakenstein Correctional Centre)
 Makapans Valley and Limeworks at Makapansgat
 Mapungubwe
 Motsetsi
 Non Pareille 
 Plovers Lake 
 Robben Island 
  Royal Observatory, Cape of Good Hope.
 Sarah Baartman Site 
 SAS Pietermaritzburg
 Sterkfontein caves 
 Swartkrans Palaeontological Site 
 Union Buildings
 Voortrekker Monument
 Wonderwerk Cave

Lists of South African provincial heritage sites 

The lists have been split up by province. Some districts have been split off from their province for site performance reasons. 
 List of heritage sites in Eastern Cape

 List of heritage sites in Albany
 List of heritage sites in Graaff-Reinet
 List of heritage sites in Port Elizabeth

 List of heritage sites in Free State
 List of heritage sites in Gauteng
 List of heritage sites in KwaZulu-Natal

 List of heritage sites in Pietermaritzburg

 List of heritage sites in Limpopo
 List of heritage sites in Mpumalanga
 List of heritage sites in North West
 List of heritage sites in Northern Cape

 List of heritage sites in Colesberg
 List of heritage sites in Kimberley
 List of heritage sites in Richmond
 List of heritage sites in Victoria West

 List of heritage sites in Western Cape

 List of heritage sites in Paarl
 List of heritage sites in Simonstown
 List of heritage sites in Stellenbosch
 List of heritage sites in Swellendam
 List of heritage sites in Table Mountain
 List of heritage sites in the Cape
 List of heritage sites in Tulbagh
 List of heritage sites in Worcester
 List of heritage sites in Wynberg

See also
South African Heritage Resources Agency
Heritage Western Cape
National heritage sites (South Africa)
Provincial heritage site (South Africa)
Heritage objects (South Africa)
National Monuments Council (South Africa and Namibia)

References

External links

 South African Heritage Resources Agency
 unesco.org

South African culture
Historic sites in South Africa
Monuments and memorials in South Africa
Heritage Sites